Panait is a Romanian name derived from the Greek Panagiotis. It is the equivalent of the Bulgarian name Panayot. Other forms include Panaiot, Panaiote, Panaiut, Panaet and Panaitache.

Surname
Bogdan Panait (born 1983), Romanian football player
Cristian Panait, Romanian prosecutor for criminal investigation at the Supreme Court of Justice
Enache Panait (born 1949), Romanian former wrestler and Olympic competitor
Ion Panait (born 1981), amateur Romanian Greco-Roman wrestler

Given name
Panait Cerna (1881–1913), Romanian poet, philosopher, literary critic and translator
Panait S. Dumitru or Perpessicius (1891–1971), Romanian literary historian and critic, poet, essayist and fiction writer
Panait Istrati (1884–1935), Romanian writer of French and Romanian expression
Panait Mușoiu (1864–1944), Romanian anarchist and socialist activist, author of the first Romanian translation of The Communist Manifesto

See also
Panai (disambiguation)
Panaitan
Panarit

References

Given names of Greek language origin
Romanian-language surnames
Romanian masculine given names